The  is an imperially-commissioned Japanese history text. Completed in 797, it is the second of the Six National Histories, coming directly after the Nihon Shoki and followed by Nihon Kōki. Fujiwara no Tsugutada and Sugano no Mamichi served as the primary editors. It is one of the most important primary historical sources for information about Japan's Nara period.

The work covers the 95-year period from the beginning of Emperor Monmu's reign in 697 until the 10th year of Emperor Kanmu's reign in 791, spanning nine imperial reigns. It was completed in 797 AD.

The text is forty volumes in length. It is primarily written in kanbun, a Japanese form of Classical Chinese, as was normal for formal Japanese texts at the time. However, a number of "senmyō" 宣命 or "imperial edicts" contained within the text are written in a script known as "senmyō-gaki", which preserves particles and verb endings phonographically.

References

External links
 
 
Text of the Shoku Nihongi (Japanese)
Further information and text of the Shoku Nihongi at Japanese Historical Text Initiative
manuscript scans at Waseda University Library

8th century in Japan
8th-century history books
Late Old Japanese texts
Heian period in literature
History books about Japan
797
Emperor Kanmu
8th-century Japanese books
History books of the Heian Period